Robert Boardman Howard (1896–1983), was a prominent American artist active in Northern California in the first half of the twentieth century. He is also known as Robert Howard, Robert B. Howard and Bob Howard. Howard was celebrated for his graphic art, watercolors, oils, and murals, as well as his Art Deco bas-reliefs and his Modernist sculptures and mobiles.

Early life and education

Howard was born in New York City on September 20, 1896, to artist Mary Robertson Bradbury (1864–1963) and architect John Galen Howard as the second of five children.  His siblings included Social Realist muralist John Langley Howard (1902–1999); Abstract-Surrealist painter, Charles Houghton Howard (1899–1978); architect, Henry Temple Howard (1894–1967) and Jeanette Howard Wallace (1905–1998).

When he was six years old, the family moved to Northern California. They settled in Berkeley, where John Galen Howard was hired to supervise the erection of the Hearst Memorial Mining Building at the University of California, Berkeley. Robert completed grammar school, but dropped out of Berkeley High School and was tutored privately by Arthur Upham Pope with a focus on art history.

Between 1913 and 1916 he studied under Xavier Martinez, Eric Spencer Macky, Worth Ryder, and Perham Wilhelm Nahl at California School of Arts and Crafts (today's California College of the Arts) in Berkeley. He became acquainted with Alexander Calder in 1915 during the Panama–Pacific International Exposition. After graduation Howard traveled across country, first stopping at an artist colony in Woodstock, New York, where he participated in an early Maverick Festival near Woodstock. Later he moved to New York City, and continued his training at the Art Students League of New York studying under Kenneth Hayes Miller, and F. Luis Mora.

He returned to California in 1917, joined the United States Army Signal Corps, and was sent to France. At the end of World War I he studied in Koblenz with the American printmaker George Taylor Plowman, and in Paris at the Academie Colarossi and the Academie de la Grand Chaumiere. He again met Alexander Calder and the two traveled together. One of Howard's paintings, The Road to Hell, was accepted to the 1920 Salon in Paris and was later exhibited in San Francisco.

Career 
In February 1923 he found employment at the firm of J. H. Keefe in San Francisco making architectural ornaments. He crested several stage sets for the Berkeley Playhouse.

In the summer of 1924, Howard joined his former art teacher Worth Ryder, and artist Chiura Obata on a three months camping and sketching trip to the High Sierra Nevada country in California. He created carvings and a series of watercolors as a result of this trip.

In March 1925 his display of Modernist paintings and sculpture at San Francisco's Galerie des Beaux Arts created much interest as well as a storm of controversy over the "unfortunate nude" in his painting Misfortune in a Hayfield.  Howard dismissed the hullabaloo and asserted his right to artistic freedom.  That summer, after he completed ornaments for the new Temple Emanuel in San Francisco and for the First Congregational Church in Oakland, he traveled to Europe to study Romanesque sculpture. By December 1926, he had returned to the San Francisco Bay Area via New York City, and accepted several commissions to paint decorative mural maps for the bay ferries. The following spring and summer he exhibited frequently in Berkeley and San Francisco. He also began to experiment with articulated sculptures and created for the Puppet Players Theatre a series of marionettes, which were praised by the master puppeteer James Blanding Sloan. Most of 1928 was spent on a grand tour around the world. His letters describing adventures in Europe, the Middle East, India, Ceylon, and Indonesia were serialized in The Argus newspaper.  In January 1929, the Galerie des Beaux Arts staged a one-man show of his recent drawings, watercolors, and carvings to rave reviews.

Three of the Howard brothers and two of their wives held a joint exhibition in the spring of 1935 at San Francisco's Paul Elder Gallery, where Robert's pastels and paintings were enthusiastically received. At the start of World War II he worked at the Camouflage Research Laboratories.  Despite the challenges of his ever-increasing deafness, he began teaching in 1944 at the California School of Fine Arts (today's San Francisco Art Institute) and at Mills College in Oakland, where he was placed on the staff of the prestigious Creative Arts Workshop.  In October 1947 he premiered his non-objective art film Meta, which depicted the slow-motion action of various colors dropped into water.

In January 1949, the University of California, Berkeley staged a massive retrospective exhibition of all facets of his art.

Death and legacy 
Robert Boardman Howard died on February 18, 1983, in Santa Cruz, California, at the age of 86. Howard's work is featured in many public museum collections including San Francisco Museum of Modern Art (SFMoMA), Oakland Museum of California, the Fine Arts Museums of San Francisco, Addison Gallery of American Art at Phillips Academy, Rhode Island School of Design Museum, Nora Eccles Harrison Museum of Art, among others.

Personal life 
Howard was married to fellow artist Adaline Kent on August 5, 1930, after they worked together on the Pacific Stock Exchange building, a Miller and Pflueger architecture firm project. The couple had two children, Ellen and Galen. Adaline died on March 1, 1957, in an auto accident.

Work

Exhibitions 
For a more complete list, including some reviews and exhibited titles, see note 
 1920 - Salons des Artistes Français, Paris, France;
 1921-1951 - Palace of Fine Arts, San Francisco, California;
 1921-1972 (with prizes in 1923, 1924, 1925, 1941, 1943, 1944, 1946) San Francisco Art Association Annuals, San Francisco, California;
 1922 – Salons of America, New York, New York;
 1922-1924 - Annual Exhibitions of the Arts & Crafts Club, Carmel-by-the-Sea, California;
 1923 – National Sculpture Society (N.S.S.), New York;
 1923 - Western Painters of Southern California, Los Angeles, California;
 1923 - Print Rooms (Robert Howard's first one-man exhibition), San Francisco, California;
 1923-1930 - The League of Fins Arts, Berkeley, California;
 1923-1933 – Gallerie des Beaux Arts, San Francisco, California;
 1923-1947 – Oakland Art Gallery, Oakland, California;
 1927 - American Institute of Graphic Arts, Oakland, California;
 1927 - California State Fair, Sacramento, California;
 1927 - Boston Art Club, Boston, Massachusetts;
 1927 - American Institute of Architects, San Francisco, California;
 1927-1928 Modern Gallery Group at the East-West Gallery, San Francisco, California;
 1932-1948 – California Palace of the Legion of Honor (C.P.L.H), San Francisco, California;
 1933 - Gump's Gallery, San Francisco, California;
 1935-1976 – San Francisco Museum of Art (SFMA), California;
 1936-1947 - Art Institute of Chicago, Chicago;
 1937 – Corcoran Gallery of Art, Washington, D.C.; 
 1937, 1941, 1943, 1944 – San Francisco Art Association First Medal for Sculpture 
 1939 – World's Fair, New York, New York;
 1939 – Golden Gate International Exposition (G.G.I.E.), San Francisco, California;
 1943-1950 – de Young Museum, San Francisco, California;
 1948-1955 – Whitney Museum of American Art, New York, New York;
 1949 – Retrospective, University of California at Berkeley, California;
 1951 - Metropolitan Museum of Art, New York, New York;
 1951-1955 – São Paulo, Brazil; 
 1956 – 1956 Annual Exhibition of Contemporary American Sculpture, Watercolors and Drawings, Whitney Museum of American Art, New York City, New York; 
 1962 - World's Fair, Seattle, Washington;
 1962-1964 – Salon de Mai, Paris, France; 
 1969-1974 – Oakland Museum of California, Oakland, California.
 1971 – San Francisco Art Commission, San Francisco, California;

Awards and honors 
 1925 – Ann Bremer prize for painting "Mount Tamalpais", San Francisco Art Association;
 1946 – "for Eyrie," San Francisco Art Association;
 1951 – "Night Watch," San Francisco Art Commission;
 1955 – "Rocket," San Francisco Art Institute.
 2013 – Preservation Award, Art Deco Society of California

Membership 
California Society Mural Artists, San Francisco Art Institute, San Francisco Museum of Art (SFMA), UC Berkeley Art Museum, Museum of Modern Art (MoMA).

References

External links
 Robert Boardman Howard, collection at the San Francisco Museum of Modern Art (SFMOMA)
 Oral history interview with Robert Boardman Howard, September 16, 1964 (Archives of American Art, Smithsonian Institution)
 Robert Boardman Howard papers, from 1916-1975 (Archives of American Art, Smithsonian Institution)
 Article: "Stone Orcas Wait to Frolic at City College", from San Francisco Chronicle, January 13, 2009
 Photographs of a mobile sculpture exhibit by Robert B. Howard from the UC Santa Cruz Library's Digital Collections

1896 births
1983 deaths
American muralists
American artisans
Section of Painting and Sculpture artists
Artists from the San Francisco Bay Area
20th-century American painters
American male painters
Painters from California
Académie Colarossi alumni
People from Santa Cruz County, California
California College of the Arts alumni
Art Students League of New York alumni
United States Army personnel of World War I
20th-century American male artists